Ali Yar (also Romanized as ‘Alī Yār; also known as Aliar and ‘Alyār) is a village in Jushin Rural District, Kharvana District, Varzaqan County, East Azerbaijan Province, Iran. At the 2006 census, its population was 182, in 45 families.

References 

Towns and villages in Varzaqan County